Lalehzar District is a district (bakhsh) in Bardsir County, Kerman Province, Iran. At the 2006 census, its population was 9,473, in 2,227 families.  The district has one city Lalehzar.  The district has two rural districts (dehestan): Lalehzar Rural District and Qaleh Asgar Rural District.

References 

Bardsir County
Districts of Kerman Province